Hilyard M. Brown (February 16, 1910 – October 12, 2002) was an American art director. He won an Oscar in the category Best Art Direction for the film Cleopatra.

Selected filmography
 Creature from the Black Lagoon (1954)
 The Night of the Hunter (1955)
 Cleopatra (1963)

See also
 Art Directors Guild Hall of Fame

References

External links

American art directors
Best Art Direction Academy Award winners
People from Nebraska
1910 births
2002 deaths
American production designers